The Great Songs from "My Fair Lady" and Other Broadway Hits is the fifteenth studio album by American pop singer Andy Williams and was released in September 1964 by Columbia Records, one month before the premiere of the film version of My Fair Lady starring Audrey Hepburn.

The album made its first appearance on Billboard magazine's Top LP's chart in the issue dated September 26 of that year and remained on the album chart for 33 weeks, peaking at number five. The album received Gold certification from the Recording Industry Association of America on September 17, 1965.

The single from the album, "On the Street Where You Live", debuted on the Billboard Hot 100 in the issue of the magazine dated September 12, 1964, eventually reaching number 28 during its eight-week stay. The song performed even better on the magazine's Easy Listening (or Adult Contemporary) chart, reaching number three during its eight weeks there.

The album was released on compact disc for the first time as one of two albums on one CD by Collectables Records on March 23, 1999, the other album being Williams's Columbia album from the spring of 1964, The Academy Award-Winning "Call Me Irresponsible" and Other Hit Songs from the Movies.  This same pairing was also released as two albums on one CD by Sony Music Distribution in 2000. The Collectables CD was included in a box set entitled Classic Album Collection, Vol. 1, which contains 17 of his studio albums and three compilations and was released on June 26, 2001.

Reception

Billboard magazine wrote, "A sure-fire winner results from the combination of Andy Williams and selections from My Fair Lady during the season when the Warner Bros. film treatment of the Broadway hit musical will go into national release. This is further buttressed with a half dozen top tunes from other Broadway shows."

Track listing

Side one
Songs from My Fair Lady:
 "On the Street Where You Live" (Alan Jay Lerner, Frederick Loewe) – 3:12
 "I've Grown Accustomed to Her Face" (Lerner, Loewe) – 3:07
 "I Could Have Danced All Night" (Lerner, Loewe) – 2:18
 "Get Me to the Church on Time" (Lerner, Loewe) – 1:58
 "Wouldn't It Be Loverly" (Lerner, Loewe) – 2:30
 "Show Me" (Lerner, Loewe) – 2:02

Side two
 "Hello, Dolly!" from Hello, Dolly! (Jerry Herman) – 2:58
 "Where or When" from Babes in Arms (Richard Rodgers, Lorenz Hart) – 2:35
 "Begin the Beguine" from Jubilee (Cole Porter) – 3:15
 "Once Upon a Time" from All American (Lee Adams, Charles Strouse) – 3:30
 "People" from Funny Girl (Bob Merrill, Jule Styne) – 3:32
 "The Sweetest Sounds" from No Strings (Richard Rodgers) – 2:44

Personnel
From the liner notes for the original album:

Andy Williams – vocals
Robert Mersey – conductor, producer
Bob Cato – cover photo

References

Bibliography

1964 albums
Andy Williams albums
Columbia Records albums
Covers albums